Vyroneia (before 1924: Χατζή Μπεηλίκ - Chatzi Beilik) is a town located in the municipal unit of Petritsi in the northwestern part of Serres regional unit, Greece. It is situated near the Bulgarian border, on the right bank of the river Strymon, south of the Kerkini mountains, and east of the Lake Kerkini. Vyroneia is 4 km west of Neo Petritsi and 12 km northwest of Sidirokastro. Vyroneia had 923 inhabitants at the 2011 census.

Histrory 

Vyroneia, then known as Hadji-Beylik, was a military base for the Greek army during the Second Balkan War.

Transport
The settlement has a station on the railway line from Thessaloniki to Serres and Alexandroupoli.  Near the train station is the National Aquarium of Vyroneia, the second in Greece after Rhodes.  The Vyroneia Cultural Society presents every June a cultural event called "Vyroneia".

Historical population

Persons
Ioannis Melissanidis
Kostas Iosifidis

External links
Vyroneia Aquarium

See also
List of settlements in the Serres regional unit

References

Populated places in Serres (regional unit)